The 1987 Cork Junior A Hurling Championship was the 90th staging of the Cork Junior A Hurling Championship since its establishment by the Cork County Board. The championship began on 4 October 1987 and ended on 1 November 1987.

On 1 November 1987, Cloyne won the championship following a 6–08 to 3–06 defeat of Ballincollig in the final at Páirc Uí Chaoimh. This was their third championship title overall and their first title since 1961.

References

1987 in hurling
Cork Junior Hurling Championship